Phạm Thị Thảo (born 5 June 1989, Hanoi) is a Vietnamese rower. She competed in 2012 Summer Olympics in the women's lightweight double sculls with Pham Thi Hai.  They were the first Vietnamese rowing team ever to qualify for the Olympic Games.

References

External links
 

1989 births
Living people
Vietnamese female rowers
Olympic rowers of Vietnam
Rowers at the 2012 Summer Olympics
Rowers at the 2010 Asian Games
Asian Games medalists in rowing
Rowers at the 2014 Asian Games
Rowers at the 2018 Asian Games
Asian Games gold medalists for Vietnam
Asian Games silver medalists for Vietnam
Asian Games bronze medalists for Vietnam
Medalists at the 2010 Asian Games
Medalists at the 2014 Asian Games
Medalists at the 2018 Asian Games
Sportspeople from Hanoi
Southeast Asian Games gold medalists for Vietnam
Southeast Asian Games silver medalists for Vietnam
Southeast Asian Games medalists in rowing
Competitors at the 2013 Southeast Asian Games
Competitors at the 2015 Southeast Asian Games
21st-century Vietnamese women
Competitors at the 2021 Southeast Asian Games
20th-century Vietnamese women